Bir El Djir is a district in Oran Province, Algeria, on the Mediterranean Sea. It was named after its capital, Bir El Djir.

Municipalities
The district is further divided into 3 municipalities:
Bir El Djir
Hassi Bounif
Hassi Ben Okba

Districts of Oran Province